Poecilographa is a genus of marsh flies in the family Sciomyzidae.  There is at least one described species in Poecilographa, P. decora.

Species
P. decora (Loew, 1864)

References

Further reading

External links

 

Sciomyzidae